Divas En Español is a compilation album produced by Sony Internacional and Columbia Records, with some tracks in Spanish from the show VH1 divas (and the series), that include some bonus tracks from different albums and new recordings specially for it.  Is rare to find it and, it comes with bonus tracks in Latin America.

Track listing 
 Otro Amor Vendrá (I Will Love Again) - Lara Fabian
 Solo Otra Vez (All By Myself) - Celine Dion 
 Mi Todo (My All) - Mariah Carey
 Si Voy A Perderte (Don't Wanna Lose You Now) - Gloria Estefan
 Corazón - Carole King
 Amar Es Para Siempre (Promise Me You'll Try) - Jennifer Lopez
 Tal Vez Es Amor (I Think I'm In Love With You) - Jessica Simpson
 Burn - Tina Arena
 Yo Viviré (I Will Survive) - Gloria Gaynor
 Dame Amor (Gimme Love) - Alexia
 Vida De Mi Vida (You're My One And Only) - Jennifer Rush

Latin America track listing
 Otro Amor Vendrá (I Will Love Again) - Lara Fabian
 Sola Otra Vez (All By Myself) - Celine Dion
 Verás (You'll See) - Madonna
 Mi Todo (My All) - Mariah Carey
 Si Voy A Perderte (Don't Wanna Lose You Now) - Gloria Estefan
 Corazón - Carole King
 Amar Es Para Siempre (Promise Me You'll Try) - Jennifer Lopez
 Tal Vez Es Amor (I Think I'm In Love With You) - Jessica Simpson
 Se Fue - Laura Pausini
 Burn - Tina Arena
 Yo Viviré (I Will Survive) - Gloria Gaynor
 Dame Amor (Gimme Love) - Alexia
 Vida De Mi Vida (You're My One and Only) - Jennifer Rush

2001 compilation albums